Maurice Riemer Calhoun Sr. (April 5, 1909 – August 4, 1994), was Louisiana politician who served in the Louisiana State Senate as a Democrat from 1944 to 1952, representing parts of DeSoto and Caddo parish. 
 
Calhoun later managed the 1952 presidential campaign in DeSoto Parish for Republican presidential nominee Dwight D. Eisenhower, who won the parish, but lost the electoral vote of Louisiana.

References

 

 

1909 births
1994 deaths
People from Mansfield, Louisiana
Democratic Party Louisiana state senators
Businesspeople from Louisiana
American real estate businesspeople
Centenary College of Louisiana alumni
20th-century American businesspeople
20th-century American politicians